Andrew Frank Schoeppel (November 23, 1894 – January 21, 1962) was an American politician and a member of the Republican Party. He was the 29th governor of Kansas from 1943 to 1947 and a U.S. Senator from 1949 until his death. He was born in 1894 in Claflin, Kansas, and died in 1962 of abdominal cancer at the National Naval Medical Center at Bethesda, Maryland.

Early life and political career 

Schoeppel was born near Claflin, Kansas, to immigrant parents from Bohemia. He attended public school and the University of Kansas, but left college to join the Naval Air Service during World War I. After returning home, he graduated from the University of Nebraska Law School in 1922 and was admitted to the Kansas bar the next year.

His early political life began as county attorney in Ness County, Kansas, and was one of the early local officials for Ness City.  Later he was elected mayor of Ness City and also served as chairman of the Kansas Corporation Commission.

In 1952 Schoeppel supported Senator Robert A. Taft for president over fellow Kansan Dwight D. Eisenhower.

Schoeppel voted in favor of the Civil Rights Act of 1957, but did not vote on the Civil Rights Act of 1960.

College football 
Schoeppel played college football from 1920 to 1922 while attending the University of Nebraska and made "honorable mention" on one of Walter Camp's first All-America football teams.  He served as the head football coach at Fort Hays State University for one season, in 1929, compiling a record of 2–5.  Schoeppel filled in as head coach while his predecessor, William D. Weidein, was on sabbatical.  Weidein did not return after his one-year sabbatical.  After Schoeppel completed his one year as head coach, the school's program was taken over by W. C. "Jack" Riley.

Head coaching record

See also 
 List of United States Congress members who died in office (1950–99)

References

External links 
 Publications concerning Kansas Governor Schoeppel's administration available via the KGI Online Library
 

1894 births
1962 deaths
Republican Party governors of Kansas
Mayors of places in Kansas
Republican Party United States senators from Kansas
Fort Hays State Tigers football coaches
Nebraska Cornhuskers football players
University of Kansas alumni
United States Navy personnel of World War I
People from Barton County, Kansas
People from Ness City, Kansas
Deaths from cancer in Maryland
Deaths from stomach cancer
Methodists from Kansas
Kansas lawyers
20th-century American politicians
Players of American football from Kansas
American people of Bohemian descent
United States Naval Aviators